Thirteen ships of the Royal Navy have been named HMS Shark (or HMS Sharke) after the shark:
 was an 8-gun brigantine launched in 1691 and sold in 1698.
 was a 14-gun sloop launched in 1699 and captured by French forces in 1703.
 was a 14-gun sloop launched in 1711, rebuilt in 1722 and sold in 1732.
 was a 14-gun sloop launched in 1732 and sold in 1755.
 was a 16-gun sloop purchased on the stocks in 1775 and launched in 1776. She was converted to a fireship and renamed HMS Salamander in 1778, and was sold in 1783. She then became the mercantile Salamander and was seriatem a whaler, convict transport to Australia, whaler, and slaver. She is last listed in Lloyd's Register in 1811.
 was a 16-gun sloop launched in 1779. She was used as a receiving ship on the Jamaica station from 1803 to 1816 and foundered in Port Royal harbor in 1818; her remains were sold a few months later.
 was a 28-gun sixth rate bought in 1780 that foundered with the loss of her entire crew during a storm off North America in 1780.
 was a 4-gun Dutch hoy purchased in 1794 and handed over to French forces in 1795 at La Hogue by her crew during a mutiny.
 was a  launched in 1894 and broken up in 1911.
 was an  launched in 1912. She was sunk at the battle of Jutland in 1916.
 was an  launched in 1918 and scrapped in 1931.
 was an S-class submarine launched in 1934. She was disabled by an air attack in 1940 and sank the next day.
, an S-class destroyer launched in 1943. She was transferred to the Royal Norwegian Navy on completion in 1944 and renamed . She was sunk later that year.

Citations and references

Citations

References

Hepper, David J. (1994) British Warship Losses in the Age of Sail, 1650-1859. (Rotherfield: Jean Boudriot). 

Royal Navy ship names